Der Fan is a 1982 West German horror thriller film directed by Eckhart Schmidt. The film follows a disturbed teenage girl's obsessive love for a pop singer named R who, after meeting her, eventually reveals that he does not love her back, leading to disastrous consequences.

An uncut and restored version was released by Mondo Macabro on DVD and Blu-ray in 2015.

Plot
Simone (Désirée Nosbusch) loves a new-wave style pop singer known only as R (Bodo Steiger) and does nothing else but listen to his music and write him fan letters. She doesn't eat, she doesn't sleep, and she starts skipping class. Every day she waits at the local post office in hopes that a letter from R has come for her. This fixation on R has consumed her entire persona, and she has internalized all her passions into a lifeless shell. When Simone finally meets R at an autograph session outside a television studio, she freezes up and faints.

R instantly takes a liking to her, inviting her into his dressing room and to the rehearsal of his show. Much to his entourage's dismay, he leaves without revealing his next move and takes Simone back to a friend's apartment which he has the keys for. After having sex with her, R rejects Simone, crushing all her fantasies of a life with him. Simone bludgeons R to death with a statue, then carves up his body and places his dismembered parts in the freezer. Simone cooks R and eats him piece by piece. She grinds his bones into ash and scatters him outside the same television studio. When a bulletin emerges on the news as a shaven-headed Simone returns to her parents' home, reporting the mysterious disappearance of R, Simone eerily writes him his last fan letter stating he'll always be a part of her and that she missed her period.

Reviews 
German provocateur Eckhart Schmidt here deftly ditches the flavor-of-the-month new wave teenybopper angst angle of Christiane F. in favor of a wonderfully roiling, sordidly screw-loose psychosexual tension that would make even Brian De Palma blush. [...]

[...] Subtler than most SadicoNazista cinema, Der Fan parallels the roles of idol and dictator, civilian and fan, codependent lovers enmeshed in eroticized propaganda, commerce, and spectacle. [...]

It's virtually impossible to explain why The Fan is a horror film without spoiling the entire third act, but let's just say this haunting, deeply creepy slice of German new wave creepiness has been steadily building up a cult following on home video with very good reason for over three decades. Fans of Audition in particular should get a kick out of this one, which is still a riveting experience and bound to catch any unprepared viewer completely off guard. [...]

[...] The Fan has a dual identity which is quite similar to that of Andrzej Zulawski's Possession. Indeed, it follows closely Simone's obsession with the pop star and gradual detachment from the real world, but its story also serves as a metaphor for Germany's fascination with Adolf Hitler and National Socialism.[...]

[...] The film is complemented by a stylish soundtrack blending elements of early dark wave and electro pop/synthesizer rock which was created by the German band Rheingold. [...]

[...] Hugely controversial in Germany upon its release in 1982, Der Fan is something of a precursor to Takashi Miike's Audition — although where the Japanese filmmaker's work won plaudits, Schmidt's was pilloried by the critics. It's more art house than grind house, despite its reputation, and for an hour or so, it's slow and dream-like, reflecting the romantic preoccupations of its teen protagonist. Dialogue is kept to a minimum, enhancing the film's dreamlike qualities, but it means Simone remains a detached enigma impossible for the audience to understand. [...]

[...] The otherworldly mood for The Fan is derived from the performances at play. Dèsirèe Nosbusch, as the anodyne Simone, provides the perfect centerpiece; playing out her part almost devoid of obvious emotion for most of the running time. Yet an undercurrent of crazed obsession bubbles beneath the surface — before exploding in explicit style — and this lends Nosbusch's character a quality and depth that makes for a mesmerizing watch. The actress' striking looks make her appear like a model that has slipped straight from the pages of a teen magazine — circa 1982. Her performance is one of detached cool, that gives the air of anything can happen, and it does it in quite an unorthodox fashion.

[...] Utterly unique, highly memorable, The Fan is a delightful and rare piece of West German horror that deserves a place in the genre archives as a cult classic. Highly recommended to all lovers of 80's, Euro-cult and psychological horror.

References

External links
 
 

1982 films
1982 horror films
1980s horror thriller films
1980s psychological horror films
1980s psychological thriller films
Films about cannibalism
Films about fandom
Films about singers
Films about stalking
German horror thriller films
1980s German-language films
German psychological thriller films
Teensploitation
West German films
1980s German films